At the 1932 Winter Olympics, four speed skating events were contested. For the only time in the Olympic history, the speed skating were held as pack-style events, having all competitors skate at the same time. Women were allowed to compete in speed skating for the first time in history in a set of demonstration events. The IOC was reluctant to upgrade women’s events to full medal events, although the organizing committee of the Games advocated for the full inclusion of women’s events. The distances for women were 500 m, 1000 m and 1500 m. The pack-style racing would pave the way for short track speed skating, that would debut as a demonstration event at the 1988 Winter Olympics in Calgary before becoming an official Olympic event at the 1992 Winter Olympics in Albertville.

The men's competitions were held on Thursday, February 4, 1932, Friday, February 5, 1932, Saturday, February 6, 1932, and on Monday, February 8, 1932. The women's events were contested from Monday, February 8, 1932 to Wednesday, February 10, 1932.

Medal summary

Women's events
Speed skating events for women were demonstration events at the 1932 Games, so no official medals were awarded. Two nations, the USA and Canada, with 10 competitors entered the competition. Like the men's races that used the mass start racing in heats, the women's races were as well. The official results show the winning time for each event.

Participating nations
Eight speed skaters competed in all four events. A total of 31 male speed skaters from six nations competed at the Lake Placid Games. In addition, ten female speed skaters (five from the United States as well as five from Canada) competed in the women's demonstration events.

Medal table

References

External links
International Olympic Committee results database
III Olympic Winter Games Lake Placid 1932, 1932 (digitized version) 
 
news paper report (9 February 1932)

 
1932 Winter Olympics events
1932
Olympics, 1932